The BMW N74 is a twin-turbo V12 petrol engine which replaced the N73 and has been produced since 2008. It is BMW's first turbocharged V12 engine and is also used in several Rolls-Royce models.

Design
Compared with its naturally aspirated BMW N73 predecessor, the N74 features twin-turbochargers. In its base configuration the engine has a compression ratio of 10:1 and a specific fuel consumption of 245 g·kW−1·h−1

As per its predecessor, the N74 has direct injection, DOHC and variable valve timing (called double-VANOS by BMW). However, the N74 does not have variable valve lift (called Valvetronic by BMW).

The N74 marked BMW's first use of an 8-speed automatic transmission, in the form of the ZF 8HP90.

Versions

N74B60 
The redline is 7000 rpm and the compression ratio is 10.0:1.

Applications:
 2008–2015 F01/F02/F03 760i/760Li

N74B66 

The redline is 7000 rpm and the compression ratio is 10.0:1.

N74B66TU 
Applications:
 2016 - 2022 G12 M760Li xDrive

N74B68
The 6.75 litre version was introduced in the 2018 Rolls-Royce Phantom. It is also used in the Rolls-Royce Cullinan and Rolls-Royce Ghost, both of which are built on the same platform as the new Phantom.

Applications:
 2017–present Rolls-Royce Phantom VIII
 2018–present Rolls-Royce Cullinan
 2021–present Rolls-Royce Ghost

References

N74
V12 engines
Gasoline engines by model